The canton of Les Mureaux is an administrative division of the Yvelines department, northern France. It was created at the French canton reorganisation which came into effect in March 2015. Its seat is in Les Mureaux.

It consists of the following communes:
 
Chapet
Ecquevilly
Évecquemont
Gaillon-sur-Montcient
Hardricourt
Meulan-en-Yvelines
Mézy-sur-Seine
Les Mureaux
Tessancourt-sur-Aubette
Vaux-sur-Seine

References

Cantons of Yvelines